ARB, ARb or arb may refer to:

Places 
 Ann Arbor (Amtrak station) (Amtrak station code)
 Ann Arbor Municipal Airport (IATA airport code)

Brands and enterprises
 ARB, Inc., predecessor of Primoris Services Corporation
 American Research Bureau

Computing
 Arb, an interval arithmetic package related to GNU MPFR
 OpenGL Architecture Review Board
 ARB assembly language, for GPU instructions

Finance, economics, and business
 muni arb or municipal bond arbitrage
 Arbitrage betting

Government 
 Administrative Review Board (Labor) of the US Department of Labor
 Air Resources Board, California Environmental Protection Agency
 Architects Registration Board, UK statutory body

Language
 Arb (gesture), hand signals used on financial trading floors
 Modern Standard Arabic (ISO 639-3 code)

Military 
 Administrative Review Board, for prisoners in the Guantánamo Bay detention camps
 Air Rescue Boat

Science, engineering, and health care
 Accumulative roll bonding of metal sheets
 Angiotensin II receptor blocker, a blood pressure medication
 ARB Project, for phylogenetic analysis
 Arbitrary unit or arb unit
 Royal Academies for Science and the Arts of Belgium

Sports
 ARB (martial art), a Russian martial art
 Australian Racing Board for horse racing

Transportation
 Arbroath railway station, UK (National rail code)
 Arth-Rigi-Bahn, a Swiss mountain railway

Other uses
 ARB (band), a Japanese rock band
 Breton Revolutionary Army, an illegal organization